Lyoncross railway station was intended to be a railway station between the towns of Newton Mearns and Barrhead, Scotland as part of the Lanarkshire and Ayrshire Railway.

History 
The station was never finished or opened to passengers. Its location was close to the junction between the Lanarkshire and Ayrshire Railway and the Paisley and Barrhead District Railway near Balgray Reservoir. The former L&AR line here is still open on the Neilston branch of the Cathcart Circle Line.

The location of the station can be discerned by the widening of the tracks just east of Aurs Road between Newton Mearns and Barrhead. The section of track between Barrhead South and Lyoncross was never used.

References

Notes

Sources

External links
Video footage of the site of Lyoncross Junction

Disused railway stations in East Renfrewshire
Barrhead